Leontin is a Romanian male given name that may refer to:

Leontin Chițescu (born 1980), footballer
Leontin Doană (born 1970), Romanian footballer and manager
Leontin Grozavu (born 1967), Romanian football player and manager
Leontin Sălăjan (1913–1966), Romanian communist military and political leader
Leontin Toader (born 1964), Romanian football goalkeeper

Romanian masculine given names